Kephalē literally means "head" in ancient Greek.   
 Kephale (Attica)
 Kephale (New Testament)
 Kephale (Byzantine Empire)

Greek words and phrases